Shane Prince (born November 16, 1992) is an American-Belarusian professional ice hockey forward playing for HC Spartak Moscow of the Kontinental Hockey League (KHL). He previously played for the New York Islanders and the Ottawa Senators of the National Hockey League (NHL). He was selected by the Senators in the second round (61st overall) of the 2011 NHL Entry Draft. He was traded to the Islanders in February 2016.

Playing career

Junior
Prince was raised in Spencerport, New York. As a youth, he played in the 2005 Quebec International Pee-Wee Hockey Tournament with a minor ice hockey team from Syracuse, New York.

Prince was selected by the Kitchener Rangers of the Ontario Hockey League in the 2008 OHL draft. Prince joined the Rangers for the 2008–09 season at age 15, as the league's youngest player.

On January 8, 2010, midway through his second OHL season, Prince was acquired by the Ottawa 67's in exchange for a third-round draft pick. In his third season, Prince became one of the OHL's top offensive players. Prince was selected to the CHL Top Prospects game played at the Air Canada Centre and scored the lone goal for Team Cherry. In April 2011, NHL Central Scouting ranked Prince 26th among North American skaters in its annual final rankings for the 2011 NHL Entry Draft.

Professional
Prince was selected in the second round, 61st overall, in the 2011 NHL Draft by the Ottawa Senators. The pick Ottawa used to select Prince was obtained from the Boston Bruins in the Chris Kelly trade.

After recording 18 goals and 38 points in 47 games with the Binghamton Senators of the American Hockey League Prince made his NHL debut with the Senators on February 16, 2015 vs the Carolina Hurricanes. Prince registered an assist in the game. He played one additional game with Ottawa and was then returned to Binghamton. Prince would go on to lead the Binghamton Senators in scoring tallying 28 Goals, 37 Assists for 65 Points while being selected to the season ending AHL All-Star Team.

Prince started the 2015–16 season with the Ottawa Senators, scoring his first NHL goal on November 25, 2015 against the Colorado Avalanche in Colorado. He finished the game with two goals and one assist and was selected as the game's first star. Although being among the team leaders in points production per 60 minutes played he was often scratched by Senators coach Dave Cameron. Prince was traded to the New York Islanders on February 29, 2016, along with a seventh round pick, in exchange for a third round pick in the 2016 NHL draft. Senators GM Bryan Murray stated in a press conference that Prince "wasn't playing much here, he deserved to play".

Prince played a regular shift for the Islanders for the remainder of the season scoring 3 goals and 2 assists in 20 games helping New York qualify for the Stanley Cup Playoffs. Prince scored his first NHL playoff goal on April 17, 2016 in game three of the first round vs the Florida Panthers. The Islanders eliminated the Panthers in six games winning their first playoff series in 23 years. In game one of the second round vs the Tampa Bay Lightning, Prince scored two goals in the first period leading the Islanders to a 5-3 victory in Tampa on April 27, 2016. Prince was named the game's first star and became the youngest Islander in 28 years to score two goals in a playoff game and the first Islander in 34 years to score a pair of first period goals in a playoff game. The Lightning eliminated the Islanders in five games with Prince finishing tied for second in team playoff goals with three.

On July 1, 2016, Prince signed a two-year contract extension with the Islanders valued at $1.7 million.

As an impending restricted free agent following the 2017–18 season, Prince was not tendered a qualifying offer by the Islanders resulting in his status as an unrestricted free agent on June 25, 2018. On August 4, 2018, Prince signed a two-year contract worth CHF 1.2 million with Swiss club, HC Davos of the National League (NL). However, on November 16, Prince terminated his contract with Davos after 16 games, stating that he intended to return to the NHL.

Prince subsequently signed a contract in the Kontinental Hockey League (KHL) with Russian based club, HC Sibir Novosibirsk, who acquired his rights from HC Vityaz on November 21, 2018. The following season, he signed with Belarusian club, Dinamo Minsk.

After two productive seasons with Dinamo Minsk, and having gained Belarusian citizenship, Prince left as a free agent to continue in the KHL with Avtomobilist Yekaterinburg, agreeing to a two-year contract on May 4, 2021. In the 2021–22 season, Prince collected 7 goals and 17 points through 33 regular season games, as Avtomobilist missed the post-season. On March 1, 2022, Prince left the KHL and joined Swiss club, HC Lugano of the NL, for the remainder of the season.

As a free agent in the off-season, Prince opted to return to the KHL, agreeing to a one-year contract with HC Spartak Moscow, on July 11, 2022.

International career
On January 26, 2021, the Belarus Ice Hockey Federation announced that Prince had accepted an offer to play for the Belarus men's national ice hockey team in the 2021 IIHF World Championship.

Career statistics

Regular season and playoffs

International

Awards and honors

References

External links 

1992 births
American men's ice hockey left wingers
Avtomobilist Yekaterinburg players
Binghamton Senators players
Bridgeport Sound Tigers players
HC Davos players
HC Dinamo Minsk players
Ice hockey players from New York (state)
Kitchener Rangers players
Living people
HC Lugano players
New York Islanders players
Ottawa 67's players
Ottawa Senators draft picks
Ottawa Senators players
HC Sibir Novosibirsk players
HC Spartak Moscow players
Sportspeople from Rochester, New York
Belarusian ice hockey left wingers
Naturalized citizens of Belarus
American expatriate ice hockey players in Russia
American expatriate ice hockey players in Canada
American expatriate ice hockey players in Belarus
American expatriate ice hockey players in Switzerland
Belarusian expatriate sportspeople in Russia
Belarusian expatriate sportspeople in Switzerland